Mallotus resinosus, the resinous kamala , is a species of 12m tall shrub, evergreen plant in the family Euphorbiaceae. It is native to India, Sri Lanka  to New Guinea and Australia. The plant is known as "கருவாளிச்சீ / karuvalichchi" by Tamil people.

Leaves
Elliptic to obovate; base attenuate; margin serrate.

Flowers
Inflorescence - present, where male flowers are clustered and unbranched. Female flowers are also unbranched, but with 3 locules and few short spines.

Fruits
Globose seeded capsule.

Chemistry
Scientists found a simple coumarin, called Scopoletin from the root extraction of resinous kamala. It was identified as the active principle responsible for DNA cleavage activity during the extraction process. The chemical was once thought that it was only found within plants of the genus, Scolopia.

References

resinosus
Flora of tropical Asia
Flora of Australia
Taxa named by Francisco Manuel Blanco